The 1920 King's Birthday Honours in New Zealand, celebrating the official birthday of King George V, were appointments made by the King on the recommendation of the New Zealand government to various orders and honours to reward and highlight good works by New Zealanders. They were announced on 3 June 1920.

The recipients of honours are displayed here as they were styled before their new honour.

Knight Bachelor
 John Roberts  – of Dunedin.

Companion of the Imperial Service Order (ISO)
 Thomas Noel Brodrick  – of Wellington; under-secretary of the Lands and Survey Department.

References

Birthday Honours
1920 awards
1920 in New Zealand
New Zealand awards